Aparallactus moeruensis, or the Zaire centipede-eater, is a species of venomous rear-fanged snake in the family Atractaspididae. It is found in the southern Democratic Republic of the Congo (formerly known as Zaire).

References

de Witte, G.F. and R.F. Laurent. 1943. Contribution à la systématique des Boiginae du Congo Belge (Rept.) [and errata slip]. Rev. Zool. Bot. Afr. 37:157-189.

Atractaspididae
Snakes of Africa
Reptiles of the Democratic Republic of the Congo
Endemic fauna of the Democratic Republic of the Congo
Taxa named by Raymond Laurent
Taxa named by Gaston-François de Witte
Reptiles described in 1943